The following lists events that happened during 1891 in New Zealand.

Incumbents

Regal and viceregal
Head of State – Queen Victoria
Governor – The Earl of Onslow

Government and law
Following their victory in the 1890 election the Liberal Government forms the 11th New Zealand Parliament, taking office on 24 January. This is the first time a single political party forms a government in New Zealand.

The new Liberal Government restricts future terms of appointment to the Legislative Council to 7 years. Previous appointments have been for life.

Speaker of the House – William Steward becomes Speaker taking over from Maurice O'Rorke.
Premier – John Ballance takes office on 24 January, replacing Harry Atkinson.
Minister of Finance – John Ballance takes office on 24 January, replacing Harry Atkinson.
Chief Justice – Hon Sir James Prendergast

Parliamentary opposition
Leader of the Opposition – John Ballance (Liberal Party) until 23 June, then John Bryce (Independent) until 31 August, then  William Rolleston (Independent).

Main centre leaders
Mayor of Auckland – John Upton followed by William Crowther
Mayor of Christchurch – Samuel Manning followed by Charles Gray
Mayor of Dunedin – John Carroll followed by Charles Robert Chapman
Mayor of Wellington – Arthur Winton Brown

Events
13 January – The first public phonograph performance in New Zealand is made at Christchurch.
17 March – The S.S. Alice is the first mechanically powered vessel to pass through Ohau Channel and the first to operate on Lake Rotoiti. Among the passengers are Governor Onslow and Lady Onslow. (see also 1889)

Arts and literature

Music

Sport

Athletics
12 August Godfrey Shaw sets the first (unofficial) world record by a New Zealander. He runs 57.2 seconds for 440 yards hurdles at the Isle of Man.

National Champions, Men
The 440 yards hurdles is held for the first time.

100 yards – J. King (Wellington) Race won by W. Macpherson (Australia)
250 yards – J. King (Wellington) Race won by W. Macpherson (Australia)
440 yards – J. Hutchison (Auckland) Race won by W. Macpherson (Australia)
880 yards – Derisley Wood (Canterbury)
1 mile – Derisley Wood (Canterbury)
3 miles – Derisley Wood (Canterbury)
120 yards hurdles – Harold Batger (Wellington)
440 yards hurdles – Harold Batger (Wellington)
Long jump – T. Upfill (Auckland)
High jump – tie J. Hume (Wellington) and E. Laurie (Auckland)
Pole vault – T. Upfill (Auckland)
Shot put – Timothy O’Connor (Auckland)

Chess
National champion: R.J Barnes of Wellington

Boxing
 14 January: Bob Fitzsimmons wins the world middleweight boxing title by beating Jack (Nonpareil) Dempsey.

Horse racing

Harness racing
 Auckland Trotting Cup (over 3 miles) is won by Rarus

Thoroughbred racing
 New Zealand Cup – British Lion
 New Zealand Derby – Florrie
 Auckland Cup – Pinfire
 Wellington Cup – Cynisca

Season leaders (1890/91)
 Leading flat jockey – G. Collelo

Lawn bowls
Dissatisfied with their remoteness from the national association the North Island clubs and those from Nelson form a separate Northern Bowling Association.
National Champions
Singles – G. White (Milton)
Fours – D. Campbell, W. Weir, D. Mackie and W. Carswell (skip) (Taieri)

Polo
The New Zealand Polo Association is formed from clubs in Auckland, Christchurch, Dunedin, Rangitikei, North Canterbury and Waikari.

Savile Cup winners – Christchurch

Rowing
National Champions (Men)
Single sculls – W. Bridson (Wellington)
Double sculls – Star
Coxless pairs – Wellington
Coxed fours – Wellington

Rugby union
Provincial club rugby champions include:
see also :Category:Rugby union in New Zealand

Shooting
Ballinger Belt – Private C. Kruse (Wanganui Rifles)

Soccer
Provincial Champions: – This is the first year any provincial championship is recorded. Auckland commenced in 1892.
Wellington: Petone Wanderers

Swimming
National champions (Men)
100 yards freestyle – H. Bailey (Auckland)
440 yards freestyle – H. Bailey (Auckland)
880 yards freestyle – H. Nicholson (Auckland)

Tennis
National championships
Men's singles – J. Marshall
Women's singles – J. Rees
Men's doubles – Richard Harman and Frederick Wilding 
Women's doubles – K. Hitchings and E. Gordon

Births
 13 December: Frank S. Anthony, writer 
 18 December: Tiaki Omana, politician, rugby union player.
 25 December: Clarrie Grimmett, Australian cricketer.

Deaths 
 5 January: Henry Manders, Member of Parliament. 
 5 June: Harry Farnall, politician.
 20 July: (in London, England) Frederick Weld, politician and governor.

See also
List of years in New Zealand
Timeline of New Zealand history
History of New Zealand
Military history of New Zealand
Timeline of the New Zealand environment
Timeline of New Zealand's links with Antarctica

References
General
 Romanos, J. (2001) New Zealand Sporting Records and Lists. Auckland: Hodder Moa Beckett. 
Specific

External links